Kepler-90g (also known by its Kepler Object of Interest designation KOI-351.02) is a super-puff exoplanet orbiting the early G-type main sequence star Kepler-90, one of eight planets around this star discovered using NASA's Kepler space telescope. The exoplanet was found by using the transit method, in which the dimming effect that a planet causes as it crosses in front of its star is measured. It orbits its parent star about every 210.5 days at a distance of 0.71 astronomical units.

Kepler-90g's orbital period changes by 25.7 hours between two consecutive transits, caused by gravitational perturbations from other planets in the system. Additionally, changes in the depth and duration of transit events led to an exomoon being hypothesized to orbit this planet. However, this candidate moon was later found to be a false positive.

This is between the masses of Uranus and Neptune. Several possible explanations for its apparently low density include a puffy planet with a dusty atmosphere or a smaller planet surrounded by a tilted wide ring system (albeit the latter option is less likely due to the lack of evidence for rings in transit data).

See also 

 Kepler-1625b
 Kepler-51
 HIP 41378 f

References 

Exoplanets discovered by the Kepler space telescope
Exoplanets discovered in 2013
Transiting exoplanets
Giant planets
Draco (constellation)